The 223rd (Scandinavians) Battalion, CEF was a unit in the Canadian Expeditionary Force during the First World War.  Based in Winnipeg, Manitoba, the unit began recruiting in early 1916 in Military Districts 10, 11, 12, and 13.  After sailing to England in May 1917, the battalion was absorbed into the 11th Reserve Battalion on May 14, 1917.  The 223rd (Scandinavians) Battalion, CEF had one Officer Commanding: Lieut-Col. H. M. Hannesson. The battalion also had the Bohemian detachment consisting of volunteers from among Czech emigrants to Canada and the United States, who were also allowed to carry their own red and white flag.

See also
197th Battalion (Vikings of Canada), CEF

References

Battalions of the Canadian Expeditionary Force
Military units and formations of Manitoba